Deer Mountain is a  mountain peak located in the Tongass National Forest in the Ketchikan Gateway Borough, Alaska, which dominates the skyline behind downtown Ketchikan.

References 

Mountains of Ketchikan Gateway Borough, Alaska
Tongass National Forest
Mountains of Alaska